This is a list of Chinese-language television programme broadcast on Mediacorp Channel 8, a television channel in Singapore.

The years stated in the list are the years in which the programmes were first aired on the channel.

Current programming

News
 Morning Express - 晨光第一线
 News 8 At One - 1点新闻
 Hello Singapore - 狮城有约
 Hello Singapore Highlights
 News Tonight - 晚间新闻 
 Singapore Today - 狮城6点半
 60s News in Brief

Current Affairs
 Tuesday Report - 星期二特写
 Focus - 焦点
 Frontline - 前线追踪

Infotainment
 Body SOS - 小毛病大问题
 Crimewatch - 绳之以法

Drama
 Communion  -  回归 (2023)
 Silent Walls  - 密宅 (2023)
 Jalan Jalan - 带你去走走 
 The Unbreakable Bond - 寄生 
 A Jungle Survivor - 森林生存记 
 Poetic Justice – 微笑正义 
 Dream Coder – 梦想程式

Comedy
 Don't Worry Be Happy - 敢敢做个开心人

Home Shopping
 Deals For Joy - 好货驾到

Lifestyle
 The Star Athletic - 星牌运动员 (2023) (Monday)
 Jason's Daily Eats - 阿贤这么吃 (2023) (Tuesday)
 Old Taste Detective S4 - 古早味侦探4 (2023) (Wednesday)
 Homegrown Flavours - 香港原味道 (2023) (Thursday)

Reality
 Streamers Go Live - 谁是带货王
 Golden Age Talentime - 黄金年华之斗歌竞艺
 The Star Voice 2022 - 寻找星声音 2022

Kids
 Wishes - 许愿泡泡茶 (2023)
 Diary Of Amos Lee S2 - 阿莫的日记2 (2023)
 Magic Eye is Back S1 - 天眼归来 S1 (2023)
 Team S.T.E.A.M! S1 & S2 - 超学先锋 S1 & S2 (2023)
 How to Train your Future - 我的未来有未来 (2023)

Talk
 Love 972 Live TV Show - Love 972 电视版
 Silver Carnival - 银色嘉年华 2022

Former programming

Current Affairs 

 Money Week - 财经追击
 World This Week - 世界一周

Children's shows 

 Fun Lab - 疯狂实验室 (2012)
 See The World – 娃娃看天下 (2012)
 Think BIG – 我的小小发明 (2012)
 Today I Am - 下课追梦去 (2012)

Drama

Action horror crime drama series 

 Breakout – 破天网 (2010)
 Game Plan – 千方百计 (2012)
 Mind Game – 心迷 (2015)
 Sudden – 骤变 (2013)
 The Challenge – 谁与争锋 (2001)
 The Tax Files – 流金税月 (Millenium 2000)
 The Queen – 复仇女王 (2016)

Anthology series 

 Chronicles Of Life – 我爱我家真情实录 (2004)
 Health Matters – 一切由慎开始 (2002)
 Health Matters 2 – 一切由慎开始2 (2003)

Biographical drama series 

 Through Thick and Thin – 阿灿正传 (2001)

Comedy-drama series 

 Absolutely Charming – 糊里糊涂爱上它 (2012)
 A Million Treasures - 百万宝 (2006)
 Brotherhood – 有情有义 (2002)
 Baby Boom – 我家四个宝
 Double Bonus – 双星报喜 (2012)
 Four Walls and a Ceiling – 我爱黄金屋 (2000)
 Hello From The Other Side – 阴错阳差 (2019)
 Home in Toa Payoh – 家在大巴窑
 Housewives' Holiday - 煮妇的假期 (2009)
 Just in Singapore - 一房半厅一水缸 (2008)
 Leave No Soul Behind - 21点灵 (2021)
 Like Father, Like Daughter - 宝贝父女兵 (2007)
 Mrs P.I. – 查某人 (2010)
 My Agent Is A Hero 2 – 流氓经纪2 (2019)
 My One in a Million – 我的万里挑一 (2019)
 No Problem! – 考试家族 (2002)
 Oh Dad! – 偶像爸爸 (2004)
 Right Frequency - 播音人 (1998)
 Soul Detective - 灵探 (2022)
 Soul Doctor - 灵医 (2022)
 The Best Things In Life – 五福到 (2010)
 The Glittering Days – 星光灿烂 (2013)
 The Hotel – 大酒店 (2001)
 Yours Fatefully – 孤男寡女 (2012)

Docufiction drama series 

 The Day It Rained on Our Parade – 那一年我们淋着雨 (2012)

Drama series 

 Baby Blues - 谁家母鸡不生蛋 (2005)
 Destiny - 梦在手里 (2005)
 Destiny In Her Hands – 断掌的女人 (2012)
 Be Happy – 生日快乐 (2011)
 Fallen Angel - 天使的烙印 (2008)
 Fantasy – 星梦情真 (2002)
 I Only Care For You – 我只在乎你 (2001)
 In Safe Hands - 守护星 (2022)  
 Let It Shine - 萤火虫的梦 (2007)
 Life Angel - 生命天使 (2009)
 Love at First Bite - 遇见你真香 (2022)
 Lucky Numbers – 发财八百万 (2002)
 Magical Hands - 猜心妙手 (2006)
 Money Game - 金钱本色 (2006)
 My Teacher Is A Thug – 爱.不迟疑 (2017)
 Precious Babes – 3个女人一个宝 (2010)
 Rhapsody in Blue - 蓝色仙人掌 (2006)
 Shuang Xiang Pao - 双响炮 (2008)
 Something Good – 算了,算了... (2001)
 The Beautiful Scent - 美丽的气味 (2008)
 The Enchanted – 浴女图 (2013)
 The Greatest Love of All - 爱·特别的你 (2007)
 The Reunion – 顶天立地 (2001)
 The Stratagem – 世纪攻略 (2001)
 The Vagrant – 豹子胆 (2002)
 Three Women and A Half – 三个半女人 (2001)
 Through It All - 	海的儿子 (2006)
 Time to Heal - 等一个晴天 (2006)
 Happy Prince - 快乐王子 (2020)
 Honour and Passion - 宝家卫国 (2007)
 True Heroes - 真心英雄 (2003)
 When Duty Calls - 卫国先锋 (2017)
 When Duty Calls 2 - 卫国先锋2 (2022)

Family drama series 

 118 Reunion – 118 大团圆 (2018)
 A Good Wife – 亲爱的，我爱上别人了 (2016)
 A New Life - 有福 (2005)
 A Promise for Tomorrow - 拥抱明天 (2005)
 All is Well  – 你那边怎样.我这边OK (2019)
 Baby Bonus - 添丁发财 (2009)
 Beautiful Connection – 九层糕 (2002)
 Blessings – 祖先保佑 (2014)
 By My Side - 不凡的爱 (2008)
 Daddy at Home - 企鹅爸爸 (2009)
 Dear Neighbours – 我的左邻右里 (2019)
 Dear, Dear Son-In-Law -  女婿当家 (2007)
 Devotion – 阿娣 (2011)
 Don't Stop Believin – 我们等你 (2012)
 Double Happiness I and II  - 喜临门 I 和 II (2004)
 Fifty & Fabulous – 五零高手 (2018)
 Happy Family – 过好年 (2010)
 Good Luck – 百岁大吉 (2015)
 Hainan Kopi Tales – 琼园咖啡香 (2000)
 Hand In Hand – 手牵手 (2015)
 Have A Little Faith – 相信我 (2017)
 Heart to Heart – 心点心 (2018)
 Hero – 大英雄 (2016)
 Holland V – 荷兰村 (2003)
 Home Again – 多年后的全家福 (2022)
 Home Truly – 回家 (2017)
 House of Fortune – 钱来运转 (2016)
 House of Joy - 欢乐满屋 (2006)
 How Are You? – 好世谋 (2019)
 Gonna Make It – 小小传奇 (2013)
 I'm in Charge – 小子当家 (2013)
 I Love My Home – 我爱我家 (2004)
 It Takes Two – 对对碰 (2012)
 It's a Wonderful Life – 好运到 (2013)
 Kinship I & II - 2007
 La Femme - 绝对佳人 (2008)
 Live Again - 天堂鸟 (2007)
 Love Blossoms I - 心花朵朵开 (2008)
 Love Blossoms II - 心花朵朵开 (2008)
 Love is Beautiful – 美丽家庭 (2003)
 Love Thy Neighbour – 四个门牌一个梦 (2011)
 Man of the House - 男人当家 (2007)
 Measure of Man - 大男人, 小男人 (2006)
 Mightiest Mother-in-Law – 最强岳母 (2017)
 My Buddy - 难兄烂弟 (2009)
 My Home Affairs – 家事 (2000)
 My Kampong Days – 家在半山芭 (2010)
 My Lucky Charm – 情来运转 (2005)
 My Mighty-in-Laws – 野蛮亲家 (2004)
 Nanny Daddy - 奶爸百分百 (2008)
 New Beginnings – 红白囍事 (2010)
 On the Fringe 2011 – 边缘父子 (2011)
 Our Rice House - 我们的饭店 (2008)
 Portrait of Home I && II - 同心圆 (2005)
 Priceless Wonder – 游戏人生 (2010)
 Prosperity – 喜事年年 (2011)
 Reunion Dinner - 团圆饭 (2009)
 Strike Gold – 黄金巨塔 (2023)
 Super Senior – 长辈甜心 (2015)
 The Defining Moment - 沸腾冰点 (2008)
 The Dream Job – 绝世好工 (2016)
 The Golden Path - 黄金路 (2007)
 The In-Laws – 麻婆斗妇 (2011)
 The Ties that Bind – 家财万贯 (2004)
 The Beginning - 原点 (2007)
 The Shining Star - 星闪闪 (2006)
 The Wing of Desire – 天使的诱惑 (2002)
 Three Wishes – 三个愿望 (2014)
 Tiger Mum – 虎妈来了 (2015)
 Timeless Gift – 遗情未了 (2004)
 To Mum with Love – 非一般妈妈 (2004)
 Say Cheese - 西瓜甜不甜 (2018)
 Viva Le Famille – 好儿好女 (Season 1: 2002; Season 2: 2003)
 Walk With Me – 谢谢你出现在我的行程里 (2019)
 Welcome Home, My Love - 	快乐一家 (2009)
 Where the Heart Is - 大城情事 (2008)
 While You Were Away – 一切从昏睡开始 (2019)
 Women of Times - 至尊红颜 (2006)
 You Are The One – 二分之一缘分 (2005)
 Your Hand In Mine - 想握你的手 (2009)

Fantasy drama series 

 Fairy of the Chalice - 夜光神杯 (2006)
 Happily Ever After - 凡间新仙人 (2007)
 The Investiture of the Gods – 封神英雄榜 (2014)
 Strange Tales of Liao Zhai 2 - 聊斋奇女子 (2008)
 Switched! -幸运星 (2007)
 The Legend and the Hero - 封神榜 (2009)
 The Legend and the Hero 2 – 封神榜之武王伐纣 (2012)
 The Lucky Stars – 福禄寿三星报喜 (2005)
 The Scarlet Kid - 红孩儿 (2009)
 Prelude of Lotus Lantern – 宝莲灯前传 (2010)
 Zero to Hero – 阴差阳错 (2005)

Legal drama series 

 Dark Angel - 黑天使 (2022)
 Day Break – 天空渐渐亮 (2019)
 Family Matters - 法庭俏佳人 (2006)
 Justice In The City – 庭外和解 (2012)
 Innocently Guilty – 法内有情天 (2002)
 Legal Eagles – 法网天后 (2017)
 The Family Court – 走进走出 (2010)

Medical drama series 

 A Child's Hope – 孩有明天 (Season 1: 2003; Season 2: 2004)
 A Life of Hope – 活下去 (2005)
 Life Is Beautiful – 初一的心願 (2015)
 On the Frontline – 穿梭生死线 (2000)
 Rescue 995 – 995 (2012)
 The Caregivers – Missy 先生 (2014)
 The Oath – 行医 (2011)
 You Can Be an Angel Too – 你也可以是天使 (2015)
 You Can Be an Angel 2 – 你也可以是天使2 (2016)
 You Can Be An Angel 3 – 你也可以是天使3 (2018)
You Can Be An Angel 4 - 你也可以是天使4 (2022)

Melodrama series 

 Break Free – 曙光 (2013)
 Rhythm of Life - 变奏曲 (2008)
 Soup of Life – 砂煲肉骨茶 (2014)
 The Seeds of Life – 渔米人家 (2012)
 With You – 我在你左右 (2010)

Musical drama series 

 Crescendo – 起飛 (2015)
 Live Your Dreams - 大大的夢想 (2021)

Period drama series 

 A Song to Remember – 星洲之夜 (2011)
 An Ode to Life – 三十风雨路 (2004)
 Bukit Ho Swee – 河水山 (2002)
 Code of Honour – 正义武馆 (2011)
 Heroes in Black – 我来也 (2001)
 In Pursuit of Peace – 何日军再来 (2001)
 Kampong Ties – 甘榜情 (2011)
 My Fair Lady – 我爱钟无艳 (2005)
 My Mini-Me & Me - 很久以后的未来 - (2021)
 Springs of Life – 春到人间 (2002)
 The Dragon Heroes – 赤子乘龙 (2005)
 The Journey: A Voyage – 信约：唐山到南洋 (2013)
 The Journey: Our Homeland – 信约：我们的家园 (2015)
 The Journey: Tumultuous Times – 信约：动荡的年代 (2014)
 The Little Nyonya - 小娘惹 (2008)
 The Quarters – 猪仔馆人家 (2012)
 The Palm of Ru Lai – 新如来神掌(2005)
 Till We Meet Again – 千年来说对不起 (2018)
 Together - 当我们同在一起 (2009)
 Precious – 千金 (2014)

Police procedural drama series 

 Beyond the aXis of Truth – 法医X档案 (2001)
 Beyond the aXis of Truth II -法医X档案 2 (2005)
 C.I.D - 刑警2人组 (2006)
 C.L.I.F. – 警徽天职 (2011)
 C.L.I.F. 2 – 警徽天职2 (2013)
 C.L.I.F. 3 – 警徽天职3 (2014)
 C.L.I.F. 4 – 警徽天职4 (2016)
 C.L.I.F. 5 – 警徽天职5之海岸卫队 (2019)
 Crime Busters x 2 - 叮当神探 (2008)
 Dare to Strike – 扫冰者 (2000)
 Devil's Blues – 叛逆战队 (2004)
 Metamorphosis - 破茧而出 (2007)
 The Crime Hunters – 心网追杀 (2004)
 The Driver - 伺机 (2020)
 Unriddle - 最火搭档 (2010)
 Unriddle 2 -最火搭档2 (2012)

Romance drama series 

 96°C Café – 96 °C 咖啡 (2013)
 A Million Dollar Dream – 给我一百万 (2018)
 A Mobile Love Story - 爱情占线 (2008)
 A Tale of 2 Cities – 乐在双城 (2011)
 An Enchanted Life - 钻石情缘 (2005)
 Always on My Mind – 无炎的爱 (2003)
 As You Like It – 随心所遇 (2010)
 Babies On Board – 新生 (2018)
 Beautiful Trio – 大女人小女人 (2004)
 Beyond Words – 爱要怎么说 (2016)
 Bountiful Blessings – 万福楼 (2011)
 Close Your Eyes - 闭上眼就看不见 (2018)
 CTRL— 操控 (2021)
 Dream Coder – 梦想程式 (2016)
 Falling in Love - 情有可缘 (2007)
 Friends Forever – 我爱麻糍 (2010)
 Hello Miss Driver – 下一站，遇见 (2019)
 Her Many Faces – 有你终身美丽 (2010)
 In The Name Of Love – 最爱是你 (2014)
 Joys of Life – 花样人间 (2012)
 Knotty Liaison – 爱情百科 (2000)
 Lion.Hearts - 谈谈情，舞舞狮 (2009)
 Looking for Stars – 星锁 (2000)
 Love Concierge - 爱的掌门人 (2005)
 Love at 0°C - 爱情零度C (2006)
 Love At Risk – 爱情风险 (2013)
 Love Is All Around - 爱在你左右 (2008)
 Love Me, Love Me Not – (真爱无敌) (2001)
 Loving You – 爱。。。没有距离 (2020)
 Making Miracles - 奇迹 (2007)
 Man at Forty – 跑吧！男人 (2004)
 Mars vs Venus - 幸福双人床 (2007)
 My Love, My Home – 同一屋檐下 (2003)
 My Star Bride - 过江新娘 (2021)
 Pillow Talk – 再见单人床 (2011)
 Spice Siblings – 辣兄辣妹 (2004)
 Romance De Amour – 1加1等于3 (2003)
 Romantic Delicacies - 美食厨师男 (2009)
 Room in My Heart – 真心蜜语 (2004)
 Sealed with a Kiss – 吻我吧，住家男 (2015)
 Spice Up – 幸福料理 (2014)
 Taste of Love - 缘之烩 (2008)
 The Dream Catchers - 未来不是梦 (2009)
 The Gentlemen – 来自水星的男人 (2016)
 The Good Fight – 致胜出击 (2019)
 The Peak - 最高点 (2007)
  - 舞出彩虹 (2005)
 Yes We Can! – 我们一定行！ (2014)
 Yours Always - 让爱自邮 (2006)
 While We Are Young – Z世代 (2017)

Media Industry drama series 

 After The Stars – 攻星计 (2019)
 Poetic Justice – 微笑正义 (2012)
 The Dream Makers – 志在四方 (2013)
 The Dream Makers II – 志在四方II (2015)
 The Lead – 第一主角 (2017)

Office Politics drama series 
 
 A Jungle Survivor - 森林生存记 (2020)

Science-fiction drama series 

 29th February – 229明天见 (2018)
 Beyond – X元素 (2012)
 Blessings – 祖先保佑 (2014)
 Blessings 2 – 祖先保佑2 (2018)
 Mister Flower - 花花公子 (2021)
 Moon Fairy – 奔月 (2003)
 My Friends from Afar – 知星人 (2017)
 The Unbeatables I – 双天至尊I (1993)
 The Unbeatables II – 双天至尊II (1996)
 The Unbeatables III – 双天至尊 III (2002)

Sitcom 

 A Blessed Life – 吉人天相 (2015)
 Don't Worry, Be Healthy – 家有一保 (2016)
 My First School – 快乐第一班 (2016)
 The Recruit Diaries – 阿兵新传 (2013)
 All Around You – 回路网 (2020)

Socio-drama series 

 118 – 118 (2014)
 118 II – 118 II (2016)
 Eat Already? – 吃饱没？ (2016)
 Eat Already? 2 – 吃饱没2 (2017)
 Eat Already? 3 – 吃饱没3 (2017)
 Eat Already? 4 – 吃饱没4 (2018)
 Families on the Edge – 一家都不能少 (2015)
 Fire Up – 美味下半场 (2016)
 Healing Heroes - 医生不是神 (2022)
 Jalan Jalan – 带你去走走 (2018)
 Kopi-O II – 浓浓咖啡乌 (2002)
 Life - Fear Not – 人生无所畏 (2015)
 Life Less Ordinary – 小人物向前冲 (2017)
 My School Daze - 书包太重 (2009)
 Old Is Gold – 老友万岁 (2019)
 Peace & Prosperity – 富贵平安 (2016)
 Reach For The Skies – 不平凡的平凡 (2018)
 Recipe of Life - 味之道 (2020)
 The Heartland Hero - 邻里帮 (2021)
 You Light Up My Life – 如何对你说 (2001)

Sports drama series 

 Beach.Ball.Babes - 球爱大战 (2008)
 No Limits – 泳闯琴关 (2010)
 Table of Glory - 乒乓圆 (2009)
 The Champion – 任我遨游 (2004)
 World at Your Feet – 球在你脚下 (2014)

Standalone drama 

 Voyage of Love – 爱。起航 (2019)

Suspense drama series 

 Against The Tide – 逆潮 (2014)
 Angel's Dream – 真相 (2000)
 Beautiful Illusions – 镜中人 (2005)
 Doppelganger – 入侵者 (2018)
 Entangled  – 日落洞 (2014)
 Gifted – 天之骄子 (2018)
 Disclosed – 揭秘 (2013)
 Mind Jumper - 觸心罪探 (2021)
 Mind Matters – 心。情 (2018)
 If Only I Could – 十年…你還好嗎？ (2016)
 The Homecoming - 十三鞭 (2007)
 The Undisclosed - 迷云二十天 (2006)
 The Score – 无花果 (2010)
 The Truth - 谜图 (2008)
 The Truth Seekers – 真探 (2016)Key Witness - 关键证人 (2021)
 The Ultimatum - 双子星 (2009)
 When the Time Comes – 一线之间 (2004)

 Wuxia series 

 Madam White Snake – 白蛇新传 (2001)
 Master Swordsman Lu Xiaofeng – 陆小凤之决战前后 (2001)
 Master Swordsman Lu Xiaofeng 2 – 陆小凤之凤舞九天 (2001)
 The Last Swordsman - 天下第一 (2007)
 The Legend of Lu Xiaofeng - 陆小凤传奇 (2009)
 The Legendary Swordsman – 笑傲江湖 (2000)
 The Heaven Sword and Dragon Saber – 倚天屠龙记 (2004)
 The Shaolin Warriors'' - 少林僧兵 (2009)
Hong Kong Drama series (TVB and ATV series dubbed in Mandarin)

ATV dramas are highlighted in bold.

Taiwanese Drama series 

Dramas highlighted in bold are re-runs from the defunct SPH Mediaworks Channel U

References

External links
 Mediacorp Channel 8 official website 

 
Channel 8 Programmes
Channel 8 (Singapore)